Jombang may refer to the following places in Indonesia:
Jombang Regency, a regency of East Java
Jombang, Jombang, a district of Jombang Regency
Jombang, Jember, a district of Jember Regency, East Java
Jombang, Cilegon, a district of the city of Cilegon, in Banten province, Indonesia